"Hollywood Seven" is a song by Australian singer Jon English. The song was written by Gloria Sklerov and Harry Lloyd and produced by Rod Thomas, William Motzing. The song was the second single from English's third studio album, Hollywood Seven and became English's 3rd highest charting single, reaching No. 13 on the Australian Kent Music Report in 1976; after "Words Are Not Enough", which reached No 6 on the Australian Kent Music Report in 1978  and "Six Ribbons" credited to Jon English and Mario Millo, which reached No. 5 on the Australian Kent Music Report in 1979.

Gloria Sklerov recalls the writing of "Hollywood Seven": "On the way home on the freeway, I passed a motel called "Hollywood Eight" which intrigued me. I started to think about who might be checking in there. When I got together with Harry Lloyd, we discussed it and decided to change the name to "Hollywood Seven" because it 'sang' better. We then plotted the story and it all sort of came to be like it was meant to. We were thrilled when we heard Jon's record because they used some of the synth riffs we had used on the demo and his vocal was great... As a writer, I was very proud of Jon's version."

Track listing
 7" Single
Side A "Hollywood Seven" - 3:58
Side B "Sandcastles" - 3:06

Charts

Weekly charts

Year-end charts

Cover versions

 Dennis Waterman - 1976
 Jon English - 1976
 Anthony Newley - 1977  
 Vicki Lawrence - 1977
 Alexander Love - 1979
 Juliane Werding - 1980  (translated to German) "Grossstadtlichter" 
 Alides Hidding - 1980
 Tex Perkins - 2008
 Karsu - 2021

References

External links
 Vicki Lawrence's version of this song with lyrics

Jon English songs
1976 songs
1976 singles
Polydor Records singles